Isabella Rodríguez Guzmán (born 19 October 1993) is a Venezuelan TV host, model and beauty pageant titleholder who was crowned Miss Venezuela 2018. She represented the state of Portuguesa at the pageant and represented Venezuela at the Miss World 2019 competition where she placed as Top 40.

Life and career

Early life and education
Rodríguez was born in Petare, Miranda into a humble family belonging to the town of Petare, Sucre Municipality. She is a Industrial Security student at Antonio José de Sucre University Institute of Technology in Caracas.

Pageantry

Sambil Model 2015 
The Venezuelan chain of shopping centers Centro Sambil annually organizes an event where the best young promises of national modeling are selected. In 2015, Rodríguez was one of the 12 girls selected in the national casting to participate that year in the contest. On Tuesday, June 2, 2015, the Sambil Model Fashion Show 2015 was held, with Rodríguez winning the title.

Miss Venezuela 2018 
At the end of Miss Venezuela 2018 held on December 13, 2018, Rodríguez was crowned Miss Venezuela 2018. She represented Venezuela in Miss World 2019. Rodríguez succeeded Miss Venezuela 2017, Sthefany Gutiérrez but was crowned by Veruska Ljubisavljević, Miss Venezuela World 2018 at the final event. Her court included Alondra Echeverría from Yaracuy and Oricia Domínguez from Táchira. Since her crowning, Rodríguez has attended many events with her fellow Miss Venezuela and Mister Venezuela titleholders. She has been the creator and has promoted her project 'I dream, I can', which serves girls in vulnerable situations in her community, not only providing food or shelter, but also psychological assistance.

Miss World 2019 
In December 2019, she represented Venezuela at the Miss World 2019 pageant hosted in London, United Kingdom. For her national costume and as part of the segment 'Dances of the World', she chose to represent a Madama, one the most important characters of the Calypso de El Callao. At the 2019 Miss World pageant, Rodríguez placed as Top 40. This is the third consecutive placement for Venezuela since Ana Carolina Ugarte in 2017.

Career 

In 2019 she debuted as a TV host in the Venevisión Saturday late show Super Sábado Sensacional.

On March 2, 2020, she joined the morning magazine Portada's, which is broadcast by Venevisión. She also was part of the group of presenters for Mister Venezuela 2019 and Miss Venezuela 2020.

Television

References

External links
 

1993 births
Living people
Venezuelan female models
Venezuelan beauty pageant winners
Miss Venezuela winners
People from Caracas
Miss World 2019 delegates